Dame Muriel Sarah Spark  (née Camberg; 1 February 1918 – 13 April 2006) was a Scottish novelist, short story writer, poet and essayist.

Life
Muriel Camberg was born in the Bruntsfield area of Edinburgh, the daughter of Bernard Camberg, an engineer, and Sarah Elizabeth Maud (née Uezzell). Her father was Jewish, born in Edinburgh of Lithuanian immigrant parents, and her English mother had been raised Anglican.  She was educated at James Gillespie's School for Girls (1923–35), where she received some education in the Presbyterian faith. In 1934–35 she took a course in "commercial correspondence and précis writing" at Heriot-Watt College. She taught English for a brief time, and then worked as a secretary in a department store.

In 1937 she became engaged to Sidney Oswald Spark, thirteen years her senior, whom she had met in Edinburgh. In August of that year, she followed him out to Southern Rhodesia (now Zimbabwe), and they were married on 3 September 1937 in Salisbury. Their son Samuel Robin was born in July 1938.  Within months she discovered that her husband was manic depressive and prone to violent outbursts.  In 1940 Muriel left Sidney and temporarily placed Robin in a convent school, as children were not permitted to travel during the war. Spark returned to Britain in early 1944, taking residence at the Helena Club in London. She worked in intelligence for the remainder of World War II. She provided money at regular intervals to support her son. Spark maintained it was her intention for her family to set up home in England, but Robin returned to Britain with his father later to be brought up by his maternal grandparents in Scotland.

Between 1955 and 1965 she lived in a bedsit at 13 Baldwin Crescent, Camberwell, south-east London. After living in New York City for some years, she moved to Rome, where she met artist and sculptor Penelope Jardine in 1968. In the early 1970s they settled in Tuscany, in the village of Oliveto, near to Civitella in Val di Chiana, of which in 2005 Spark was made an honorary citizen. She was the subject of frequent rumours of lesbian relationships from her time in New York onwards, although Spark and her friends denied their validity. She left her entire estate to Jardine, taking measures to ensure that her son received nothing.

Spark died in 2006 and is buried in the cemetery of Sant'Andrea Apostolo in Oliveto.

Literary career
Spark began writing seriously, under her married name, after World War II, beginning with poetry and literary criticism. In 1947 she became editor of the Poetry Review. This position made Spark one of the only female editors of the time. Spark left the Poetry Review in 1948. In 1953 Muriel Spark was baptized in the Church of England but in 1954 she decided to join the Roman Catholic Church, which she considered crucial in her development toward becoming a novelist. She was formally instructed by Dom Ambrose Agius, a Benedictine monk of Ealing Priory, who she had known from her Poetry Society days, and was received into the Roman Catholic Church on 1st May 1954 by Dom Ambrose. Penelope Fitzgerald, a fellow novelist and contemporary of Spark, wrote that Spark "had pointed out that it wasn't until she became a Roman Catholic ... that she was able to see human existence as a whole, as a novelist needs to do". In an interview with John Tusa on BBC Radio 4, she said of her conversion and its effect on her writing that she "was just a little worried, tentative. Would it be right, would it not be right? Can I write a novel about that – would it be foolish, wouldn't it be? And somehow with my religion – whether one has anything to do with the other, I don't know – but it does seem so, that I just gained confidence." Graham Greene, Gabriel Fielding and Evelyn Waugh supported her in her decision.

Her first novel, The Comforters, was published to great critical acclaim in 1957. It featured several references to Catholicism and conversion to Catholicism, although its main theme revolved around a young woman who becomes aware that she is a character in a novel.

The Prime of Miss Jean Brodie (1961) was even more successful. Spark displayed originality of subject and tone, making extensive use of flashforwards and imagined conversations. It is clear that James Gillespie's High School was the model for the Marcia Blaine School in the novel. Her residence at the Helena Club was the inspiration for the fictional May of Teck Club in The Girls of Slender Means published in 1963.

Archive and biography
In the 1940s Spark began to keep a record of her professional and personal activities that developed into a comprehensive personal archive containing diaries, accounts and cheque books and tens of thousands of letters. Spark used her archive to write her autobiography, "Curriculum Vitae", and after its publication in 1992 much of the material was deposited at National Library of Scotland.

Spark refused permission for publication of a biography of her by Martin Stannard. Penelope Jardine holds publication approval rights, and the book was posthumously published in July 2009. On 27 July 2009 Stannard was interviewed on Front Row, the BBC Radio 4 arts programme.  According to A. S. Byatt, "she [Jardine] was very upset by the book and had to spend a lot of time going through it, line by line, to try to make it a little bit fairer".

Honours and acclaim
Spark received the James Tait Black Memorial Prize in 1965 for The Mandelbaum Gate, the Ingersoll Foundation T. S. Eliot Award for Creative Writing in 1992 and the David Cohen Prize in 1997.  She became an Officer of the Order of the British Empire in 1967 and Dame Commander of the Order of the British Empire in 1993 for services to literature. She was twice shortlisted for the Booker Prize, in 1969 for The Public Image and in 1981 for Loitering with Intent. In 1998, she was awarded the Golden PEN Award by English PEN for a "Lifetime's Distinguished Service to Literature".

Spark received eight honorary doctorates including Doctor of the University degree (Honoris causa) from her alma mater, Heriot-Watt University in 1995; a Doctor of Humane Letters (Honoris causa) from the American University of Paris in 2005; and Honorary Doctor of Letters degrees from the Universities of Aberdeen, Edinburgh, London, Oxford, St Andrews and Strathclyde.

In 2008, The Times ranked Spark as No. 8 in its list of "the 50 greatest British writers since 1945". In 2010, Spark was posthumously shortlisted for the Lost Man Booker Prize of 1970 for The Driver's Seat.

Relationship with her son
Spark and her son Samuel Robin Spark at times had a strained relationship. They had a falling out when Robin's Orthodox Judaism prompted him to petition for his late great-grandmother to be recognized as Jewish. (Spark's maternal grandparents, Adelaide Hyams and Tom Uezzell, had married in a church.  Tom was Anglican.  Adelaide's father was Jewish, but her mother was not; Adelaide referred to herself as a "Jewish Gentile.")  Spark reacted by accusing him of seeking publicity to further his career as an artist. Muriel's brother Philip, who himself had become actively Jewish, agreed with her version of the family's history.  During one of her last book signings in Edinburgh, she told a journalist who asked if she would see her son again: "I think I know how best to avoid him by now."

Bibliography

Novels
The Comforters (1957)
Robinson (1958)
Memento Mori (1959)
The Ballad of Peckham Rye (1960)
The Bachelors (1960)
The Prime of Miss Jean Brodie (1961)
The Girls of Slender Means (1963)
The Mandelbaum Gate (1965)
The Public Image (1968) – shortlisted for Booker Prize
The Driver's Seat (1970) – shortlisted for Booker Prize
Not To Disturb (1971)
The Hothouse by the East River (1973)
The Abbess of Crewe (1974)
The Takeover (1976)
Territorial Rights (1979)
Loitering with Intent (1981) – shortlisted for Booker Prize
The Only Problem (1984)
A Far Cry from Kensington (1988)
Symposium (1990)
Reality and Dreams (1996)
Aiding and Abetting (2000)
The Finishing School (2004)

Short story collections
The Go-Away Bird and Other Stories (1958)
Voices at Play (short stories and plays, 1961)
Collected Stories I (1967)
Bang-bang You're Dead (1982)
Open to the Public: New and Collected Stories (1996)
Complete Short Stories (2001)
Ghost Stories (2003)
The Snobs (2005)

Poetry
The Fanfarlo and Other Verse (1952)
Collected Poems I (1967)
Going Up to Sotheby's and Other Poems (1982)
All the Poems (2004)

Other works
Tribute to Wordsworth (edited with Derek Stanford, 1950)
Child of Light (a study of Mary Shelley) (1951)
Selected Poems of Emily Brontë (1952)
John Masefield (biography, 1953)
Emily Brontë: Her Life and Work (with Derek Stanford; 1953)
My Best Mary (a selection of letters of Mary Shelley, edited with Derek Stanford, 1953)
The Brontë letters (1954)
Letters of John Henry Newman (edited with Derek Stanford, 1957)
Doctors of Philosophy (play, 1963)
The Very Fine Clock (children's book, illustrations by Edward Gorey, 1968)
Mary Shelley (complete revision of Child of Light, 1987)
Curriculum Vitae (autobiography, 1992)
The French Window and the Small Telephone (limited edition, 1993)
The Informed Air: Essays (2014)

Critical studies and reviews of Spark's work
 Lingard, Joan (1981), review of Loitering with Intent, in Murray, Glen (ed.), Cencrastus No. 6, Autumn 1981, pp. 41 & 42

Notes

References

Works on Spark's writing
Jardine, Penelope, ed. 2018.  A Good Comb. New Directions.

External links

 The Official Website of Dame Muriel Spark (Last Internet Archive capture of defunct website - 5 March 2016)

 Muriel Spark Collection at the Harry Ransom Center 

Muriel Spark personal archive at National Library of Scotland
The Muriel Spark Papers at Washington University in St. Louis
Muriel Spark fonds at University of Victoria, Special Collections
Guardian obituary, 17 April 2006
In their own words BBC interview 3 December 1971 (Video, 30 mins)
Chrysalis: a poem by Muriel Spark from TLS, 17 January 2008
 "Dame Muriel Spark", Fellows Remembered, The Royal Society of Literature

1918 births
2006 deaths
Scottish Jewish writers
Alumni of Heriot-Watt University
Converts to Roman Catholicism from Anglicanism
Dames Commander of the Order of the British Empire
Commandeurs of the Ordre des Arts et des Lettres
Scottish Roman Catholics
Ghost story writers
David Cohen Prize recipients
James Tait Black Memorial Prize recipients
People educated at James Gillespie's High School
Writers from Edinburgh
People from Camberwell
Prix Italia winners
Roman Catholic writers
Scottish Catholic poets
Scottish expatriates in Italy
Scottish women novelists
Scottish people of Lithuanian-Jewish descent
20th-century British novelists
21st-century British novelists
20th-century British women writers
21st-century British women writers
Scottish women poets
20th-century Scottish poets
Fellows of the Royal Society of Literature
20th-century Scottish women
Christian novelists